We Walked in Song is the eighth studio album by the Innocence Mission. It was released in North America on March 13, 2007 by Badman Recording Co., with a vinyl edition containing the bonus track "Shooting Star (Sketch)" following a week later on March 20. All international versions of the album include the bonus track.

A European release containing three bonus tracks was commissioned later that year by French record label Fargo. One of these exclusive recordings, "Song from Holland," was a new song recorded after the album sessions and was sold as a one-track digital single by retailers such as iTunes and Amazon; while the other, "Do You See My Brothers Coming?," dates back to recording sessions from 2001.

Cover art
The album was released with two different cover designs, both created by Karen Peris. The CD artwork features a young girl standing between two trees with vividly colored leaves. Karen stated on their website that the artwork was inspired by an image she had seen in Leo Lionni's picture book 'Alexander and the Wind-Up Mouse.' Unable to figure out how Mr. Lionni painted such transparent pieces while also retaining vivid color schemes, Karen opted to paint the circles on mylar to create a similar effect. In the same post, she also mentioned that the young girl on the CD cover was unknown to her. She cut the image out of an old French-language text book she had found at a library book sale. The name of the photographer or identity of the young girl was not stated and she "had to hope that [they] would not mind my using the lovely photo."

The vinyl edition contained expansive artwork featuring a group of people painted using the same mylar technique used to create the leaves on the CD artwork. Since the people are placed onto the surface of the cover with a removable sticky-adhesive, the individual people could be removed from the cover and placed back onto the sleeve in any order. This feature is only found on North American editions of the vinyl, since internationally printed editions of the vinyl were made with standard glue.

Track listing
All songs written by Karen Peris.

Bonus tracks

Release history

Chart performance
Album – Charting positions

Note: The sales listed above only include physical copies bought at Nielsen SoundScan-enabled physical retailers for the weeks running March 14 until March 28, 2007. This excludes copies bought directly from The Innocence Mission's and Badman's official websites – which would be seen as the biggest sellers of Innocence Mission-related material, since many larger stores such as HMV don't stock their material.

Personnel
 Karen Peris – vocals, guitar, field pump organ, piano, Hammond organ
 Don Peris – guitars, background vocals, drums, Hammond organ
 Mike Bitts – acoustic and electric bass
 Hunter Johnson – additional drums on "Lake Shore Drive"
 Engineered and Mixed by Don Peris
 Mastered by Shawn Hatfield

References

2007 albums
The Innocence Mission albums
Badman Recording Co. albums